Khullja Sim Sim (transl. Open Sesame) is an Indian television game show which originally aired on STAR Plus for the first two seasons, premiered on 27 July 2001. The first season was hosted by Aman Verma and the second season by Hussain Kuwajerwala. The third season of the series premièred on BIG Magic on 17 September 2012, also hosted by Aman Verma, produced by 4 Lions Films.

Concept
Khullja Sim Sim is a unique game show concept that tugs at your inherent desire to trade and win. It is an Indian adaptation of the hit U.S. game show Let's Make a Deal, which aired from 1963–77, 1980–81, 1984–86, 1990–91, 2003, and currently since 2009.  
It was one of the largest ever shows produced in the country, with sets that have set the standard for game shows. More than 18000 kg of stainless steel was used in the construction of the set, in addition to 2000 sq. ft. of acrylic, 2000 sq. ft. of vinyl, 2500 bulbs, 200 tube lights, and kilometers of cabling. It's no wonder that it became the top weekly game show ever since its first episode, with a loyal audience that returns every week to be charmed by the host, the games, and the fact that they never know what's coming next! Khullja Sim Sim aired on the premiere TV channel in the country, STAR Plus (part of the News Corp empire). The show went on air in July 2001, and was on for over 2 years and 105 episodes. By the time it went off air, over 1500 participants have appeared on the show and prizes worth over Rs. 2 Crores (20 Million) distributed. Khullja Sim Sim has also garnered a mention in the Limca Book of Records, 2003.

Cast
 Aman Verma as Host
 Hussain Kuwajerwala as Host
 Sandeep Baswana as Himself

References

External links
Khullja Sim Sim News Article on BestMedia Info

Indian game shows
StarPlus original programming
Big Magic original programming
2001 Indian television series debuts
2013 Indian television series endings
Television series by Optimystix Entertainment